2776 is the second musical comedy album created and produced by Los Angeles based comedians Rob Kutner, Joel Moss Levinson, and Stephen Levinson. Released on July 4, 2014, 2776 features 28 tracks and over 80 celebrity performers. It's the story of the President in the year 2776 journeying through time to save America. The album also includes music videos for three songs: “Toymageddon,” “I’m Cured,” and “These Aren’t the Droids.” The album is a benefit for OneKid OneWorld.

Track listing

Videos
“Toymageddon” (2013)
“I’m Cured” (2014)
“These Aren’t the Droids” (2014)

Reception
2776 has been written about in USA Today, GQ, The A.V. Club, and other publications. Its liner notes, written by George Saunders, were featured in The New Yorker.

References

External links
 

2014 compilation albums
Comedy compilation albums
2010s comedy albums